John S. Arrowood (born November 4, 1956) is an American attorney and judge. In April 2017, Arrowood was appointed to the North Carolina Court of Appeals by Governor Roy Cooper, to replace Judge Doug McCullough, a Republican who resigned one month before he would have reached the mandatory retirement age.

He ran for a full term on the court in 2018 and won, becoming the first openly gay person elected to a statewide office in North Carolina.

Previously, in August 2007, he was appointed to the North Carolina Court of Appeals by Governor Mike Easley, replacing Judge Eric L. Levinson, who had resigned to accept a federal appointment. Arrowood was defeated in the subsequent 2008 election.

Biography
Born in Burnsville, North Carolina, Arrowood moved to Caldwell County after the death of his parents. He graduated from Hudson High School in 1975. Arrowood graduated magna cum laude from Catawba College in 1979 and received his J.D. degree at the University of North Carolina at Chapel Hill School of Law in 1982. He worked on the Court of Appeals staff and then practiced law for many years in Charlotte, North Carolina before serving as a state superior court judge from March through August 2007. Arrowood has been a member of the board of the North Carolina Railroad, the N.C. Banking Commission, the N.C. Rules Review Commission, and the N.C. Arts Council.

Since Arrowood was appointed to fill an unexpired term, his seat was on the ballot in November 2008. He was defeated for a full term by Robert N. Hunter, Jr.

He was also an unsuccessful candidate for the Court of Appeals in 2014, seeking the seat made vacant by the retirement of Judge John C. Martin. Arrowood came in second out of 19 candidates.

Arrowood is openly gay and was the first openly LGBT judge on the North Carolina Court of Appeals.

See also 
 List of LGBT jurists in the United States

References

External links 
Press Release from Gov. Easley
News & Observer: Arrowood named to Court of Appeals
Official biography
Arrowood Campaign site 
News & Observer: Cooper appoints Democrat to fill NC appeals court seat after GOP judge makes surprise early retirement

1956 births
Living people
American gay men
American Episcopalians
Gay politicians
LGBT Anglicans
LGBT appointed officials in the United States
LGBT judges
LGBT lawyers
LGBT people from North Carolina
North Carolina Court of Appeals judges
People from Burnsville, North Carolina
University of North Carolina School of Law alumni
University of North Carolina at Chapel Hill alumni